Sir William Alfred Brand,  (22 August 1888 – 26 October 1979) was an Australian politician. Born in Childers, Queensland, he was educated at Apple Tree Creek State School before becoming a sugarcane grower. He became president of the Australian Sugar Growers Association in 1943.

In 1920, he was elected to the Legislative Assembly of Queensland as the Country Party member for Burrum, transferring to Isis in 1932. He was Deputy Leader of the Opposition from 1944 to 1947. He retired from the Assembly in 1950, but in 1954 was elected to the Australian House of Representatives as the Country Party member for Wide Bay, which he held until his retirement in 1958. Brand was knighted in 1965.

Brand died in 1979 and was buried in Apple Tree Creek Cemetery.

References

1888 births
1979 deaths
National Party of Australia members of the Parliament of Australia
Members of the Australian House of Representatives for Wide Bay
Members of the Australian House of Representatives
Australian Knights Bachelor
Australian Commanders of the Order of the British Empire
Members of the Queensland Legislative Assembly
20th-century Australian politicians